USS Chung-Hoon (DDG-93) is an  Aegis destroyer serving in the United States Navy (USN). Chung-Hoon was named in honor of Rear Admiral Gordon Pai'ea Chung-Hoon (1910–1979), recipient of the Navy Cross and the Silver Star.

The contract to build her was awarded to Northrop Grumman Ship Systems on 6 March 1998, and her keel was laid down on 14 January 2002, at Ingalls Shipbuilding, Incorporated. She was launched on 11 January 2003, sponsored by Michelle Punana Chung-Hoon of Honolulu, Hawaii, Chung-Hoon's niece, and commissioned on 18 September 2004.

She is part of the Pacific Fleet and homeported in Pearl Harbor, Hawaii.

Service history
In October 2005, while operating 360 miles northeast of Kahului, Chung-Hoon responded to a distress call from the bulk freighter C-Laurel. Chung-Hoon provided emergency medical care until the ship was within range of Coast Guard aircraft.

In September 2006, Chung-Hoon served as host ship to the Chinese People's Liberation Army Navy's (PLAN) Luhu-class destroyer Qingdao during Qingdaos visit to Pearl Harbor. The two ships conducted communications and mobility exercises on 10 September 2006. According to Xinhua News Agency, it was the first such exercise by USN and PLAN ships and the first visit by a Chinese navy ship to a U.S. state in six years.

On 20 January 2009, Chung-Hoon departed Pearl Harbor for a scheduled deployment with the  Expeditionary Strike Group.

In 2010, the ship assisted the Philippine Navy in the Sulu Sea in operations against Islamic militants. After returning to Pearl Harbor, the ship redeployed to the western Pacific beginning on 1 June 2011.

The Republic of Singapore Navy ships ,  and  conducted joint exercise CARAT 2011 with Chung-Hoon on 23 August 2011.

On 27 January 2016, the ship deployed on a regularly scheduled Western Pacific deployment with the USS John C. Stennis Strike Group, the so-called Great Green Fleet.

In popular culture
In the novel 2034, written by Eliiot Ackerman and Admiral James G. Stavridis, Chung-Hoon is one of two US ships sunk in a naval battle that sparks World War III.

References

External links

 Ship's official site

Arleigh Burke-class destroyers
Destroyers of the United States
Ships built in Pascagoula, Mississippi
2002 ships